The Malaysia Super Series was the second Super Series tournament of the 2012 BWF Super Series. The tournament was held in Kuala Lumpur, Malaysia from 10 to 15 January 2012 and had a total purse of $400,000.

Men's singles

Seeds

  Lee Chong Wei (Champion)
  Lin Dan
  Chen Long
  Peter Gade
  Chen Jin
  Sho Sasaki
  Simon Santoso
  Nguyễn Tiến Minh

Top half

Bottom half

Finals

Women's singles

Seeds

  Wang Yihan
  Wang Xin
  Wang Shixian
  Saina Nehwal
  Tine Baun
  Jiang Yanjiao
  Sung Ji-hyun
  Juliane Schenk

Top half

Bottom half

Finals

Men's doubles

Seeds

  Jung Jae-sung / Lee Yong-dae
  Ko Sung-hyun / Yoo Yeon-seong
  Chai Biao / Guo Zhendong
  Koo Kien Keat / Tan Boon Heong
  Muhammad Ahsan / Bona Septano
  Hirokatsu Hashimoto / Noriyasu Hirata
  Alvent Yulianto Chandra / Hendra Aprida Gunawan
  Markis Kido / Hendra Setiawan

Top half

Bottom half

Finals

Women's doubles

Seeds

  Mizuki Fujii / Reika Kakiiwa
  Ha Jung-eun / Kim Min-jung
  Miyuki Maeda / Satoko Suetsuna
  Shizuka Matsuo / Mami Naito
  Cheng Wen-hsing / Chien Yu-chin
  Meiliana Jauhari / Greysia Polii
  Christinna Pedersen / Kamilla Rytter Juhl
  Poon Lok Yan / Tse Ying Suet

Top half

Bottom half

Finals

Mixed doubles

Seeds

  Zhang Nan / Zhao Yunlei
  Xu Chen / Ma Jin
  Joachim Fischer Nielsen / Christinna Pedersen
  Tontowi Ahmad / Liliyana Natsir
  Chen Hung-ling / Cheng Wen-hsing
  Sudket Prapakamol / Saralee Thungthongkam
  Songphon Anugritayawon / Kunchala Voravichitchaikul
  Shintaro Ikeda / Reiko Shiota

Top half

Bottom half

Finals

References

External links
Results on tournamentsoftware.com

2012 Malaysia Super Series
Malaysia Super Series
Malaysia Super Series
Sport in Kuala Lumpur